The Bosavi or Papuan Plateau languages are a family of the Trans–New Guinea languages in the classifications of Malcolm Ross and Timothy Usher. The family is named after Mount Bosavi and the Papuan Plateau.

Languages
The languages, which are closely related (though they may have only 10–15% of their vocabulary in common), are:
Mount Bosavi: Kaluli–Sonia, Aimele (Kware), Kasua
Onobasulu
Mount Sisa: Edolo–Beami
Dibiyaso (Bainapi)

The unity of the Bosavi languages was quantitatively demonstrated by Evans and Greenhill (2017).

Palmer et al. (2018) consider Dibiyaso to be a language isolate.

Pronouns
Pronouns are:

{|
! !!sg!!pl
|-
!1
|*na||*ni-
|-
!2
|*ga||*gi-
|-
!3
|*ya||*yi-
|}

Vocabulary comparison
The following basic vocabulary words are from the Trans-New Guinea database:

References

Shaw, R.D. "The Bosavi language family". In Laycock, D., Seiler, W., Bruce, L., Chlenov, M., Shaw, R.D., Holzknecht, S., Scott, G., Nekitel, O., Wurm, S.A., Goldman, L. and Fingleton, J. editors, Papers in New Guinea Linguistics No. 24. A-70:45-76. Pacific Linguistics, The Australian National University, 1986. 
Shaw, R.D. "A Tentative Classification of the Languages of the Mt Bosavi Region". In Franklin, K. editor, The linguistic situation in the Gulf District and adjacent areas, Papua New Guinea. C-26:187-215. Pacific Linguistics, The Australian National University, 1973. 

 
Languages of Papua New Guinea
Papuan Plateau languages